Richard Gordon Kleindienst (August 5, 1923 – February 3, 2000) was an American lawyer, politician, and U.S. Attorney General during the early stages of Watergate political scandal.

Early life and career
Kleindienst was born August 5, 1923, in Winslow, Arizona, the son of Gladys (Love) and Alfred R. Kleindienst. He attended the University of Arizona before serving in the United States Army Air Forces from 1943 to 1946. Following his military service, he attended Harvard College and Harvard Law School, graduating from the latter in 1950.

From 1953 to 1954, he served in the Arizona House of Representatives; he followed that with some 15 years of private legal practice. He concurrently was Arizona Republican Party chairman from 1956 to 1960 and 1961 to 1963, and in the 1964 Arizona gubernatorial election, the Republican candidate for Governor of Arizona, losing the general election to Sam Goddard, 53–47%.

Role in Goldwater Campaign

On January 3, 1964, Barry Goldwater asked his friend Kleindienst to serve as Director of Operations in his presidential campaign. Goldwater stipulated that he would only respond to the "draft Goldwater" movement if the campaign were led by three Republicans close to him: Kleindienst, Denison Kitchel as Campaign Manager, and Dean Burch as Assistant Campaign Manager.

Kleindienst had never worked on a national campaign. Political experts told Goldwater that F. Clifton White, an experienced GOP operative, would be a better choice. Goldwater rejected this change, but did agree to Kleindienst and White sharing the role.

Nixon administration 

After Richard Nixon won the 1968 presidential election, John N. Mitchell agreed to serve as United States Attorney General on the condition that Kleindienst serve as Deputy Attorney General. Kleindienst suspended his private practice in 1969 to accept the post of Deputy Attorney General offered him by President Nixon. This gave him responsibilities relating to the government's suit against the International Telephone & Telegraph Corporation. Nixon and his aide John Ehrlichman told him to drop the case, which created an impression that they were violating their ethical obligations in favor of ITT, and that, as an attorney himself, Kleindienst was now obligated to report these ethical lapses to the state bars in the jurisdictions involved. But in his official role as Deputy Attorney General, he also repeatedly told Congress that no one had interfered with his department's handling of the case, failing to mention either Nixon or Ehrlichman.

On February 15, 1972, Attorney General Mitchell resigned effective March 1 in order to work on the Nixon re-election campaign, with President Nixon nominating Kleindienst to serve as his successor.  After having served as Acting Attorney General for a little under three and a half months, his appointment was approved by the Senate on June 12 after an attempt to block the nomination by Ted Kennedy on the grounds of his involvement with ITT failed.

Unknown to Kleindienst, leaders of the Committee to Re-Elect the President (CRP) had tasked Gordon Liddy with arranging various covert operations, one of which was to be a burglary of the Democratic National Committee headquarters at the Watergate complex in Washington, DC. Before dawn on a Saturday, five days after Kleindienst was sworn in, James McCord and four other burglars operating on Liddy's instructions were arrested at Watergate. Later in the morning Kleindienst was officially notified of the arrests. Liddy, after a phone consultation about the arrests with CREEP Deputy Director Jeb Magruder (who had managed CREEP up until March of that year, and had the most direct organizational authority over Liddy's activities), personally approached Kleindienst the same day at a private golf club in Bethesda, Maryland. Liddy told him that the break-in had originated within CRP, and that Kleindienst should arrange the release of the burglars, to reduce the risk of exposure of CRP's involvement. But Kleindienst refused and ordered that the Watergate burglary investigation proceed like any other case.

Kleindienst ultimately resigned in the midst of the Watergate scandal nearly a year later, on April 30, 1973. This was the same day that John Dean was fired and H. R. Haldeman and John Ehrlichman resigned. In 1974, he pleaded guilty to contempt of Congress for his failing to testify fully to the Senate in a pre-Watergate investigation, involving alleged favoritism shown to ITT during his testimony as part of his Senate confirmation hearings. Kleindienst was one of very few people in modern U.S. history to be convicted of contempt of Congress; G. Gordon Liddy, another figure in the Watergate scandal, also was convicted in the 1970s.

In April 1982, the Arizona Supreme Court unanimously suspended Kleindienst from the practice of law for 1 year due to his unethical conduct, accepting a disciplinary recommendation from the state bar association. The suspension was due to statements he made to a bar investigator probing Kleindienst's representation in a 1976 insurance company fraud case. In October 1982, the U.S. Supreme Court, on a unanimous vote, disbarred Kleindienst, blocking him from practicing before the highest court.

Later life 
In 1981, Kleindienst was charged with perjury regarding how much he knew about a white-collar criminal he represented; he was subsequently acquitted.

He died at the age of 76, of lung cancer, on February 3, 2000.

Bibliography
 
 For Kleindienst's limited role in Watergate, see Leon Jaworski, The Right and the Power, and Bob Woodward and Carl Bernstein, All the President's Men .

References

External links
 

|-

|-

1923 births
2000 deaths
20th-century American politicians
American Episcopalians
American perjurers
Arizona lawyers
Arizona politicians convicted of crimes
Deaths from cancer in Arizona
Deaths from lung cancer
Harvard College alumni
Harvard Law School alumni
Republican Party members of the Arizona House of Representatives
Military personnel from Arizona
Nixon administration cabinet members
People from Winslow, Arizona
People convicted of contempt of Congress
Politicians from Prescott, Arizona
United States Army Air Forces personnel of World War II
United States Attorneys General
United States Deputy Attorneys General
Watergate scandal investigators